Hassan Al-Majhad (born 18 May 1992) is a Saudi Arabian professional footballer who plays as a midfielder for Saudi Pro League side Al-Khaleej.

Career 
Al-Majhad started his career at Al-Jeel's youth team. He made his debut during the second half of the 2013–14 season. On 15 August 2014, Al-Majhad scored his first goal for the club in a 1–1 draw with Al-Qadsiah. On 16 June 2017, Al-Majhad joined city rivals Al-Nojoom following Al-Jeel's relegation to the Second Division. On 12 July 2018, Al-Majhad joined Al-Adalah. On 16 January 2019, Al-Majhad joined Al-Orobah following his release from Al-Adalah. On 4 September 2019, Al-Majhad joined Second Division side Al-Diriyah. He made 20 appearances and scored three goals, helping them achieve promotion to the First Division. On 29 September 2020, Al-Majhad joined First Division side Al-Khaleej. During the 2021–22 season, Al-Majhad made 35 appearances and scored once, helping Al-Khaleej win the First Division title and gain promotion to the Pro League. On 20 June 2022, Al-Majhad renewed his contract with Al-Khaleej until the 2024–25 season. On 25 August 2022, Al-Majhad came off the bench to make his Pro League debut in a 2–0 loss to Al-Hilal. On 15 October 2022, Al-Majhad made his first start of the season in a 4–0 defeat to Al-Shabab.

Honours
Al-Diriyah
Second Division runners-up: 2019–20 (promotion to the First Division)

Al-Khaleej 
First Division: 2021–22

References

External links 
 

1992 births
Living people
Association football midfielders
Saudi Arabian footballers
Saudi First Division League players
Saudi Second Division players
Saudi Professional League players
Al Jeel Club players
Al-Nojoom FC players
Al-Adalah FC players
Al-Orobah FC players
Al-Diriyah Club players
Khaleej FC players